5th CFCA Awards

Best Film: 
 Malcolm X 
The 5th Chicago Film Critics Association Awards honored the finest achievements in 1992 filmmaking.

Winners
 Best Picture – Malcolm X
 Best Foreign Film – The Crying Game
 Best Director – Spike Lee – Malcolm X
 Best Screenplay – Michael Tolkin – The Player
 Best Actor – Denzel Washington – Malcolm X
 Best Actress – Emma Thompson – Howards End
 Best Supporting Actor – Jack Nicholson – A Few Good Men
 Best Supporting Actress – Judy Davis – Husbands and Wives
 Best Cinematography – Michael Ballhaus – Bram Stoker's Dracula
 Most Promising Actor – Chris O'Donnell – Scent of a Woman
 Most Promising Actress – Marisa Tomei – My Cousin Vinny / Chaplin
 Commitment to Chicago Award – Joyce Sloan

References
 http://www.chicagofilmcritics.org/index.php?option=com_content&view=article&id=49&Itemid=59
 http://articles.chicagotribune.com/1993-03-07/features/9303188305_1_awards-ceremony-oscar-voting-jack-nicholson

 1992
1992 film awards